Packera glabella (formerly Senecio glabellus) is one of several plants with the common name butterweed, this one has also been called cressleaf groundsel and yellowtop.  It is native to central and southeastern North America. It is toxic when eaten by humans.

Distribution
Butterweed is found from Texas north to South Dakota and east to Ohio with a disjunct population in Delaware.  It grows in clay and loam soils in disturbed areas and in prairie and floodplain habitats.

Native
Nearctic: 
Northeastern U.S.A.: Indiana
North-Central U.S.A.: Illinois, Kansas, Missouri, Nebraska, Oklahoma
Southeastern U.S.A.: Alabama, Arkansas, Florida, Georgia, Kentucky, Louisiana, Mississippi, North Carolina, South Carolina, Tennessee
South-Central U.S.A.: Texas

Conservation
NatureServe lists Packera glabella as Secure (G5) worldwide and Critically Imperiled (S1) in Nebraska, Imperiled (S2) in Kansas, and Vulnerable (S3) in North Carolina.

References

External links
 

glabella
Flora of North America
Plants described in 1806